Nutriomics is the science that studies the food and nutrition domains comprehensively to improve consumer's well-being and health.   
More specifically Nutriomics approaches are used to evaluate the effects of different diets to promote health and modulate the risk of disease development.

See also
 Nutrigenomics
 Functional genomics

References

External links
 What Are Omics Sciences? 
 Nutriomics Studies in Diabetes Research 

Nutritional science